Luigi Bottazzo (9 July 1845 – 29 December 1924) was an Italian organist and composer.

Life

Early years
Luigi Bottazzo (1845–1924) Italian organist and composer. Publ. ?1901–?1910]]
Bottazzo was born in Presina di Piazzola, Padua, Italy. At the age of nine he was permanently blinded in an accident. He received a musical education in counterpoint, organ and piano at Padua's Institute for the Blind, where at the age of nineteen he joined the staff.

Career
In 1865, he was appointed organist of the church of Santa Croce, Padua. In 1872 he was appointed the organist of the Basilica of Saint Anthony of Padua. Throughout his life Bottazzo was a keen supporter of liturgical reform and a proponent of the Cecilian Movement in church music.

In 1895, he joined the staff of Conservatorio di Musica di Padova as organ teacher and as a result published several pedagogical works, and a history of sacred music in Italy.

Bottazzo died in Padua on 29 December 1924.

Works
Bottazzo's catalogue of more than 500 works, includes music for piano, harmonoium and organ, solo, chamber and orchestral works, songs, and liturgical music, with over 40 mass-settings to his name.

Musical
 25 Trios, op. 101; 
 24 Preludi facili, op. 104; 
 100 Versetti, op. 105 (2 volumi);
 Preludio per G.O., op. 113;
 6 Pezzi per organo, op. 120; 
 la Santa Messa, op. 126;
 Corale ed Offertorio, op. 194; 
 Missa Pastoralis ad duas voces aequales, op. 198
 Messa Breve e Facile a due voci dispari in onore di San Martino vescovo
 7 Marce religiose, op. 204;
 Piccola Suite, op. 207; 
 Messa VIII "Degli angeli", op. 208 a
 Sonata in Re minore, op. 210; 
 Messa S.Teresa del Bambin Gesù, op.229;
 Messa S.Clara Vergine, op.262;
 Laudate Eum in Chordis et Organo, op. 269 (sette entrate solenni); 
 XII Motecta Natalicia ad chorum unius vocis mediae, op. 278
 4 Pastorali, op. 279; 
 Missa pro Defunctis, op. 281;
 Messa S.Tarcisio, op.318;
 Laus Tibi Christe, op. 339; 
 Messa nuziale, op. 368;
 Missa in honorem S. Luciae ad duas voces aequales, op. 180
 Pange lingua, op 347 a
 Ave Maris Stella, op. 347 b

Wrtings
 (n.d.) | Brevi nozioni sulle forme musicali (Turin).
 (n.d.) | L'organista di chiesa. Breve metodo per organo (Milan, n.d.).
 (n.d.) | Studi sulla periodologia musicale (Padua).
 (n.d.) | e Metodo teorico-pratico di armonia (Padua).
 (1901) | L'armonium quale strumento liturgico. Metodo teorico-pratico (Turin).
 (1901) | L'allievo al piano. Metodo teorico-pratico per imparare a suonare il pianoforte (Turin).
 (1902) | Sul vero significato di due termini musicali (Padua).
 (1905) | Metodo di canto corale ad uso delle scholae cantorum (Turin).
 (1926) | Memorie storiche sulla riforma della musica sacra in Italia (Padua).
Source:

External links 
 'Invocazione alla Regina della Pace' from Raccolta di Sette Pezzi. (Op.289. 1917). Organ solo. Online resource, accessed 16 March 2022. 
 Public domain scores by Luigi Bottazzo at IMSLP Petrucci Music Library. Online resource, accessed 6 March 2022.

References
 A. Della Corte e G.M. Gatti. Dizionario di Musica (Torino: Paravia Edizioni 1958). 

Cecilian composers
Italian male classical composers
19th-century Italian composers
20th-century Italian composers
Italian classical organists
Blind classical musicians